Mutela alata is a species of freshwater mussel in the family Iridinidae. It is endemic to Malawi, where it is known from only five locations in Lake Malawi and the Shire River.

References

Endemic fauna of Malawi
alata
Molluscs described in 1864
Taxonomy articles created by Polbot
Taxa named by Isaac Lea